The Red Patch Boys is an officially recognized supporters group for Major League Soccer's Toronto FC.  The group was founded in late 2006 by soccer fans in the Toronto area immediately after the announcement of Toronto FC's creation as Canada's first MLS franchise. An official identity, dedicated website and message board, and formal organization of the group later emerged, and the group has grown to become the largest supporters group for Toronto FC.

At Toronto FC home matches, the group is primarily based in sections 111 and 112 of BMO Field which has been named "The Bunker", though RPB members can be found scattered all throughout the stadium.  The mandate of the Red Patch Boys (RPBs) is to support and promote Toronto FC and the sport of soccer throughout Canada, and to help contribute to the atmosphere at all TFC home games. Along with the other supporter groups in Toronto, they have gained widespread notoriety for showering opposing players with streamers during corner kicks and goal celebrations. In addition to activities in their home stadium, several members also take part in away games at other MLS venues; notably Columbus, Chicago, and Foxborough. The group's name is a homage to the Red Patch Devils, a nickname given by Axis forces for the 1st Canadian Infantry Division which fought across Europe during the Second World War. The visual identity is based on the unit's badge which features a stylized Canadian Maple Leaf.

The group runs several soccer-related events and programs throughout the year and promotes  
away-game viewing parties, travels to Toronto FC away matches, and takes part in various flag-making and chant-creating sessions with other Toronto FC Supporters.  They are also involved in several charitable events and sponsor amateur youth soccer teams.  The group's message board has been noted as a very important communication tool for all Toronto FC fans. The group maintains national and international links as well, and boasts several members from across Canada and around the world.

Player of the year award
The player of the year award is presented annually by the Red Patch Boys Supporter Group to the Toronto FC player who best exemplifies outstanding on-field performance, leadership and community service.

External links

References

Major League Soccer fan clubs
Toronto FC
2006 establishments in Ontario